Statistics of Nemzeti Bajnokság I for the 1988–89 season.

Overview
16 teams participated and Budapest Honvéd FC won the championship.

League standings

Results
Results in brackets indicate the results from penalty shoot-outs whenever games were drawn.

Relegation play-offs 

|}

Statistical leaders

Top goalscorers

References
Hungary - List of final tables (RSSSF)

Nemzeti Bajnokság I seasons
1988–89 in Hungarian football
Hun